This article is about the particular significance of the year 1980 to Wales and the Welsh people.

Incumbents

Secretary of State for Wales – Nicholas Edwards
Archbishop of Wales – Gwilym Williams, Bishop of Bangor
Archdruid of the National Eisteddfod of Wales – Geraint

Events
2 January – Workers at British Steel Corporation go on strike over pay.
May – Plaid Cymru leader Gwynfor Evans announces his intention to go on hunger strike in protest against the government's failure to honour its promise of a fourth Welsh-language television channel. The government backs down on 17 September, a few weeks before Evans's deadline.
April – The Church in Wales votes to ordain women deacons.
17 May – Glan Clwyd Hospital opens at Bodelwyddan.
8 June – Dr Martyn Lloyd-Jones preaches for the last time, at Barcombe Baptist Chapel.
28 June – Penelope Clarke of Lanover marries François Fillon, future Prime Minister of France.
11 July – Britannia Bridge A55 road deck officially opened by the Prince of Wales (now Charles III).
August – Dragon Data introduces the Dragon 32 home computer.
John Maddox becomes editor of Nature.
Death of last pure-bred Rhiw sheep.
Cardiff Zoo closed.
Welsh Highland Railway Ltd begins using the name "Rheilffordd Ucheldir Cymru".

Arts and literature
Richard Burton makes one of his last stage appearances, in the musical Camelot.
Michael Bogdanov becomes Associate Director of the Royal National Theatre.
Bobi Jones is appointed to the professorial Chair in Welsh at University of Wales, Aberystwyth.
The publisher Gwasg Carreg Gwalch is founded by Myrddin ap Dafydd at Capel Garmon.

Awards
National Eisteddfod of Wales (held in Gowerton)
National Eisteddfod of Wales: Chair - Donald Evans
National Eisteddfod of Wales: Crown - Donald Evans
National Eisteddfod of Wales: Prose Medal - R. Gerallt Jones

New books
Irma Chilton - Yr Iâr Goch
Leopold Kohr - Cymru Fach
D. Tecwyn Lloyd - Bore Da, Lloyd
Alan Wilson - Arthur, King of Glamorgan and Gwent

Music
Edward H. Dafis - Plant Y Fflam (album)

Works of art
Andrew Vicari - La Marianne

Film
The Mouse and the Woman, based on a novel by Dylan Thomas, written by Vincent Kane and directed by Karl Francis, co-stars Huw Ceredig, Beti Lloyd-Jones and Dafydd Hywel.
Dragonslayer is filmed at Dolwyddelan Castle.

Broadcasting

English-language television
Ruth Madoc stars in the hit sitcom Hi-de-Hi!

Sport
BBC Wales Sports Personality of the Year – Duncan Evans
Boxing
28 February – Johnny Owen defeats Juan Francisco Rodríguez at Ebbw Vale to win the European bantamweight championship.
28 June – Johnny Owen defeats John Feeny at the Empire Pool, Wembley.
19 September – Johnny Owen fights Lupe Pintor in Los Angeles.  Owen is knocked out and goes into a coma from which he never emerges, being pronounced dead on 4 November.
Rugby union
Fifteen Welsh players are included in the squad of 38 for the 1980 British Lions tour to South Africa: Elgan Rees, Ray Gravell, David Richards, Peter Morgan, Gareth Davies, Terry Holmes, Clive Williams, Ian Stephens, Graham Price, Alan Phillips, Allan Martin, Jeff Squire, Stuart Lane, Derek Quinnell and Gareth Powell Williams.
18 October – 1 November: 1980 New Zealand rugby union tour of Wales
1 November: Wales 3–23 New Zealand
Snooker
9 February – Terry Griffiths wins the Masters, defeating Ray Reardon in an all-Welsh final.

Births
20 January – Matthew Tuck, vocalist
28 February – Katy Wix, actress
23 March – Ryan Day, snooker player
29 March – Andy Scott-Lee, singer
7 April – Carl Fletcher, footballer 
10 April – Daniel Hawksford, actor
12 April – Sara Head, table tennis player
15 April – Stephen Doughty, politician
26 May – Nick Thomas-Symonds, politician
29 June – Katherine Jenkins, singer
28 July – Noel Sullivan, pop singer
13 August – Bari Morgan, footballer
19 August – Paul Parry, footballer
20 August – Enzo Maccarinelli, boxer
3 November – Elis James, comedian
17 November – Gethin Jenkins, rugby player
16 December – Kevin Aherne-Evans, footballer
date unknown – Catrin Finch, harpist

Deaths
12 January – Howel Williams, American geologist and volcanologist of Welsh parentage, 81
31 January – Arthur "Waring" Bowen, solicitor and charity worker, 57
8 February – Miles Thomas, businessman, 82
9 February – Tom Macdonald, writer, 79
25 February – Caradog Prichard, author, 75
20 March – Alun Davies, historian, 63
6 May – Bryn Phillips, dual-code rugby international, 79
14 May – Hugh Griffith, actor, 67
4 June – Don Tarr, Wales international rugby player, 70
7 June – Idwal Davies, footballer, 80 
14 July – Aneirin Talfan Davies, critic and broadcaster, 71
15 September – Bill Evans, American jazz pianist of Welsh descent, 51 (drug-related)
7 October – Jim Lewis, footballer, 71
4 November – Johnny Owen, boxer, 24
26 November – Rachel Roberts, actress, 53 (suicide)
4 December – James Jones, Archdeacon of Huntingdon, 99
date unknown
Tom Parri Jones, poet
Jack Warner, footballer

See also
1980 in Northern Ireland

References

 
Wales
 Wales